Exposé is an American Latin freestyle vocal group formed in 1984 in Miami, Florida. Primarily consisting of lead vocalists Jeanette Jurado, Ann Curless, and Gioia Bruno, the group achieved much of their success between 1984 and 1993. They became the first group to attain four top-10 entries on the Billboard Hot 100 since their debut album, including 1988 number-one single "Seasons Change."  In March 2015, Billboard magazine named the group the eighth most-successful girl group of all-time.

The group was popular in dance clubs, mainstream Top 40, and adult contemporary charts in the United States. They actively toured and recorded music from 1984 to 1995, then retired from recording and public performances for 8 years until 2003. They currently tour today.

History

Formation of the group and original members (1983–1986)
Exposé was formed in 1984 when Lewis Martineé, a Miami disc jockey and producer, decided to form a dance-based group. Working with his partners Ismael Garcia and Frank Diaz at Pantera Productions, talent scouts hired Sandra Casañas (Sandeé), Alejandra Lorenzo (Alé), and Laurie Miller as the group's lineup, under the name X-Posed, which later became Exposé. The next year, the trio recorded "Point of No Return" for Pantera Records as both a 7-inch  and a 12-inch vinyl single. The latter became a #1 hit on the Billboard Hot Dance Club Play chart. The song helped introduce a still-popular genre of music that became known as freestyle, which often features keyboard riffs, a sing-along chorus, and electro funk drum-machine patterns in the music arrangement. The success of "Point of No Return" on the dance charts caught the attention of major labels and Expose signed with Arista Records, which promptly assumed distribution of the 12-inch vinyl single. A year later, Exposé recorded and released their second club-dance freestyle 12-inch single entitled "Exposed to Love". These songs were released during the period when radio began airing continuous mixes of House/Club/Dance songs in major markets. As such, Exposé realized continued success, including a club tour to key cities. Impressed with the performance of the two singles on the dance charts, Arista granted approval for the group to record a full-length album.

Personnel changes (1986)
During the recording of the group's first studio album Exposure, the personnel of the group changed.  Reports vary based on the source.  According to People magazine, two of the original singers quit while one of the girls was fired midway through the recording of the first album, but according to Billboard, all three were fired. Arista records felt the three original singers lacked star potential.  While Martinee states he made the decision himself to replace the three girls, Miller maintains it was all their choice and Jurado confirms that Lorenzo wanted to leave.  Shortly thereafter, Casañas  pursued a solo career and Lorenzo pursued other ambitions; they were replaced by Jeanette Jurado and Gioia Bruno. Miller began a solo career; she was replaced by Ann Curless.

Lorenzo returned to the dance charts with the Vendetta Records releases "I Wanna Know" in 1988, and "Stop Me if I Fall in Love" in 1990, while Laurie Miller released the 12" single "Parallels" on Atlantic Records and a second single "Love is a Natural Magical Thing" on Meet Me In Miami Records.  Laurie evolved into a headline performer frequently showcasing her talents on cruises with a more intimate jazz style, and formed her own entertainment company called Xica productions.

Casañas later resurfaced as a solo artist (Sandeé) and released a solo album, Only Time Will Tell, which garnered the club hits "You're The One", "Love Desire", and the Clivilles & Cole-produced bassline-heavy hit "Notice Me".  She continued to tour actively in dance clubs and freestyle shows, until her death on December 15, 2008, of a seizure at the age of 46. All three original members -Casañas, Lorenzo and Miller- later contributed vocals on songs on the eponymous 1988 debut album of the Miami group Will to Power. Gioia Bruno also provided lead vocals on Will to Power's 2004 album, Spirit Warrior.

Exposure (1986–1988)
In March 1987, the new lineup of Exposé released its debut album Exposure on Arista Records, led by the pop/dance hit "Come Go with Me" which reached #5 on the US Billboard Hot 100 chart. During the summer of 1987, a re-recorded version of "Point of No Return" was released, with Jurado now performing lead vocals. It too topped out at #5 on the US Hot 100. While the initial distribution of Exposure to suppliers contained the original 1984 version of that song, subsequent pressings contained the new version. "Let Me Be the One", a mid-tempo R&B song with Bruno on lead vocal, became yet another hit reaching #7 on the US Hot 100 and also garnering significant R&B radio airplay. The group's highest charting hit occurred in February 1988 with the #1 US hit ballad "Seasons Change". Along with that came a Soul Train Award nomination for Best New Artist; television appearances on American Bandstand, Solid Gold, Showtime at the Apollo, and The Late Show Starring Joan Rivers; and the group was tapped to be the opening act for Lisa Lisa and Cult Jam during its national tour.

Exposé also performed backing vocals on Kashif's 1987 Arista/BMG Records album Love Changes, on the song "Who's Getting Serious?".

During Exposé's peak, the group endured legal issues behind the scenes. The members had a restrictive contract and there were reports in the media of backstage battles. According to Bruno, they were only paid $200 per show. Reportedly, the record label had to intervene to try to keep the peace between the members and their producers. Despite this intervention, the members filed a lawsuit and ultimately settled their legal case for a renegotiated contract.

What You Don't Know (1989–1990)
Although not as strong a seller as its predecessor, the group's second album, What You Don't Know (1989), performed very well and was certified gold in the US for sales over 500,000. The success of Exposé led to similar girl groups being created by producers and existing ones being signed to major labels, such as Company B, The Cover Girls, Sweet Sensation, and Seduction. The first single, "What You Don't Know", peaked at #8; and the second single "When I Looked at Him" rose to #10 on the US Hot 100. As an all-female group, the next single "Tell Me Why" (#9) gave Expose seven consecutive Top 10 hits on the US Hot 100, behind The Supremes nine consecutive Top 10 hits. "Tell Me Why" addressed the issue of street gangs and youth and rewarded the group with additional praise for its socially conscious lyrics. "Your Baby Never Looked Good in Blue" (#9 U.S. Adult Contemporary / #17 Pop) and "Stop, Listen, Look & Think" (only released as a promotional 12" single) followed soon afterwards. "Stop, Listen, Look & Think" was also included in the movie The Forbidden Dance (1990), a theatrical film released during the Lambada dance craze of that period.

Exposé did their first headlining tour and continued television appearances on Soul Train, The Pat Sajak Show, The Byron Allen Show, and the Dick Clark's New Year's Rockin' Eve broadcast on December 31, 1989, among others.

The popularity of the group also increased overseas to countries such as Japan, where the members appeared in a few music video-style television commercials in 1989 for Takara CAN Chuhai, a Japanese alcoholic beverage. The music used in the Japanese commercials was the song "What You Don't Know" with slightly different lyrics in the chorus than the regular version.

With the success of Exposé's first two albums, Arista Records released the music-video compilation, Video Exposure, on VHS and laser disc formats in 1990. It contained music videos for the first eight singles released by Bruno, Curless and Jurado—from "Come Go with Me" through "Your Baby Never Looked Good in Blue."

Exposé performed backing vocals on Barry Manilow's 1990 Arista album Because It's Christmas on the track "Jingle Bells" and also appeared in Manilow's long-form music video of "Because It's Christmas." This version of "Jingle Bells" was patterned after the 1943 Bing Crosby/Andrews Sisters version.

In August 1990, while touring with Exposé, Bruno began having throat problems—later linked to a benign tumor on her vocal cords—which caused the group to cut the tour short. The group took time off from their schedule in hopes that she would recover. Ultimately, Bruno lost her voice, and could not sing at all for several years—she also had to keep talking to a minimum. She was replaced by Kelly Moneymaker in 1992.

Exposé (1991–1996)
After Kelly Moneymaker joined Exposé, the group released their self-titled, third album Exposé, which integrated more mature material in addition to their established freestyle, house, R&B, pop, and love-ballad repertoire. It was also the first album to use producers besides Martineé, with Clive Davis taking over as executive producer and Martineé only contributing production to four songs. The album was aimed to demonstrate musical growth for the group and to compete with the success of Wilson Phillips, which had great success in 1990 with their debut album.

The third album was not as commercially successful as their previous two, but it still achieved gold status, and several singles fared better on the adult-contemporary charts. The group, however, did manage to crack the U.S. Top 40 pop chart with "I Wish the Phone Would Ring" and "I'll Never Get Over You Getting Over Me", a top-ten pop single which also reached #1 on the adult contemporary chart. Subsequent releases "As Long as I Can Dream" and "In Walked Love" featured Curless in the lead-vocal spotlight. A final, club-marketed single in 1995 saw the release of the group's first remake. "I Specialize in Love" featured Curless and Jurado on lead with Moneymaker supporting lead vocals toward the song's conclusion. The original version was performed by Sharon Brown and was a top ten hit on the Billboard Hot Dance Club Play chart in 1982. Among the group's television appearances during this period include Live with Regis and Kathie Lee, The Tonight Show with Jay Leno, The Les Brown Show, and the Brazilian actress-singer children's show Xuxa.

In 1995, Exposé recorded the Diane Warren-penned song "I'll Say Good-Bye for the Two of Us", which appeared on the soundtrack of the film Free Willy 2: The Adventure Home with Jurado performing lead vocals; that same year, the song was issued on their Greatest Hits. The song is distinctive for the group as Jurado performs solo without backing vocals.

Label inactivity and solo projects
Toward the end of 1995, Arista dropped the group, and the members disbanded at the beginning of 1996 to pursue their own projects. However, over time, labels licensing music from Sony Music Entertainment, the current owners of Arista, have released two other variations of greatest hits collections, as well as a collection of popular remixes from the group's 12-inch singles, including the extended version of the original 1985 "Point of No Return."

After the group broke up, Jurado performed in the stage play Mad Hattan and supplied vocals for contemporary jazz guitarist Nils and Safe Sax; Moneymaker married soap opera actor Peter Reckell and released four solo albums (Like a Blackbird, Through These Basement Walls, "Race Against the Sky", and "Stone").  Moneymaker wrote and produced the "Love Songs" LP for NBC's Days of Our Lives and has had original songs placed in over 25 film, TV and game productions including "Guitar Hero", "Hawaii 5-0", "CSI", etc; Curless engaged in songwriting, supplying vocals to several club-dance projects, and also provided academic instruction on music and the music business. Eventually, both Jurado and Curless married and had children, temporarily retiring from performing.

In 1997, Bruno fully recovered from her throat tumor and began singing again. After a small stint with the band Wet, she worked on a solo career focused mostly on dance-oriented material. Her first album, Expose This, was released in the spring of 2004.

Reformation

After a long hiatus, on August 1, 2003, the lineup of Curless, Jurado, and Moneymaker, reunited briefly for a reunion concert at the Mid State Fair in Paso Robles, California. Members of Safe Sax, including music director/guitarist Steve Fansler, were part of the live band Exposé used. While there was a desire to do more shows, according to Moneymaker they were unable to get things active at that time.

In 2006, Jurado announced on MySpace they had signed with a major booking agency, and Bruno announced she was back with Exposé for the first time in 15 years.  Moneymaker remains an honorary member of the group and has stated she would fill in for any member who may not be available, or to appear with the full lineup on special occasions.

On October 21, 2006, Exposé kicked off its tour at the American Airlines Arena in Miami for the Freestyle Explosion concert, with the lineup of Curless, Jurado, and Bruno. On November 29, 2006, at the Potawatomi Bingo Casino Northern Lights Theater in Milwaukee, Exposé performed a 16-song show with a full band led by Steve Fansler, marking their first full concert together with Bruno since 1990. The group performed sets at freestyle concerts and gay pride events throughout the country. The group continues to perform at special events throughout the United States, including venues such as Epcot and Mohegan Sun's Wolf Den.

In 2010, Exposé informed fans on Facebook that they are recording a new album. Exposé recorded a 2011 version of their hit "Point Of No Return" working with dance producer Giuseppe D. and Chris Cox. The cd single was released on June 20, 2011. The group released a single for Christmas called "I Believe In Christmas (Like It Used To Be)" in December, 2011 co-written by Adam Gorgoni, Jeanette Jurado and Shelly Peiken. Proceeds of the single went to the Wounded Warrior Project. In August 2012, the group independently released the single "Shine On," co-written by Ann Curless.  Curless also sings lead vocals on the track.

Lawsuit over trademark
In December 2007, Jurado, Bruno, Curless, Moneymaker, Paradise Artists, and Walking Distance Entertainment were named as defendants in a lawsuit by Crystal Entertainment & Filmworks (I & II). At issue was the trademark licensing agreement for the rights to use the name Exposé.  The first case was dismissed without prejudice.  The second one went to trial.  During the process, both Paradise Artists and Moneymaker were dismissed as defendants, and a counter suit was filed against the plaintiffs.  On May 26, 2009, the court ruled in favor of the defendants on most counts, finding them only guilty of a contractual breach with the plaintiffs.  The court also ruled that the plaintiffs did not prove ownership of the mark, and established that due to the line-up being the same since 1986 (with Moneymaker only replacing Bruno because of her illness) and clear identification of the group members on the albums and with touring, the defendants showed common-law proof of ownership and the "[consumer] goodwill associated with Exposé was with the members". The court awarded Jurado, Bruno, and Curless exclusive rights to the name Exposé as a trademark.
Exposé mentioned this victory, and performed for the first time with Moneymaker as a guest at the LA Gay Pride Festival on June 14, 2009, making it the first time all four core members, Jurado, Bruno, Curless, and Moneymaker, appeared on stage together.  The plaintiffs appealed in The Eleventh Circuit court, and the judgment was affirmed in a published opinion by the district court on June 21, 2011.

Exposure (Re-issued)

In January 2015, Cherry Pop Records re-issued the group's debut album. Comprising two discs, this re-issue came with an extensive booklet, which detailed the history of Exposé, the story behind the songs, as well as the lyrics to all the tracks.

Disc One contains the full album, along with numerous bonus tracks including the radio versions of 'Come Go With Me', 'Point Of No Return', 'Seasons Change', & 'Let Me Be The One', as well as 'December' and 'Exposed To Love'. Disc Two consists of extended versions, along with the crossover mixes, often featured on the 12" & CD Singles.

One of these 'Extended' Versions is the rare original 12" version of 'Exposed To Love'.

Discography

 Exposure (1987)
 What You Don't Know (1989)
 Exposé (1992)

References

External links
 Official Web Site

Further reading
 

American dance music groups
Arista Records artists
American freestyle music groups
American dance girl groups
Musical groups established in 1984
Musical groups from Miami